Krzysztof Marek Piesiewicz (born 25 October 1945 in Warsaw, Poland) is a Polish lawyer, screenwriter, and politician. From 1991 to 1993 and from 1997 to 2011 he was a member of Polish Senate. He was the head of the Ruch Społeczny (RS) or Social Movement Party.

Life

Piesiewicz studied law at Warsaw University and began practicing in 1973. Through the late 1970s he became increasingly involved in political cases, defending opponents of the Communist regime, serving as a legal advisor for Solidarity, and assisting in the successful prosecution of the murderers of Jerzy Popiełuszko.

In 1982, he met the film director Krzysztof Kieślowski, who was planning to direct a documentary on political show trials in Poland under martial law. Piesiewicz agreed to help, though he doubted whether an accurate film could be made within the constraints of the judicial system; indeed, the filmmakers found that their presence in court seemed to be affecting the outcomes of cases, often improving the prospects of the accused, but making it hard to capture judicial abuses.

Kieślowski decided to explore the issue through fiction instead, and the two collaborated for the first time as writers on the feature film No End, released in 1984.

Piesewicz returned to his law career, but remained in touch with Kieślowski and three years later persuaded him to create a series of films based on the Ten Commandments. This series, Dekalog, explored the filmmakers' mutual interest in moral and ethical dilemmas in contemporary social and political life, and achieved (belated) critical acclaim around the world.

Their later collaborations, The Double Life of Véronique and Three Colours (Blue, White, Red), focused on metaphysical questions of personal choice and appeared relatively apolitical, though the latter series was based on Piesiewicz's idea of dramatizing the French political ideals of liberty, equality, and fraternity in the same way they had previously dramatized the Ten Commandments.

Piesiewicz was credited as co-writer on all of Kieślowski's projects after No End, the last of which was Nadzieja, directed by Stanislaw Mucha after Kieślowski's death. He has begun writing a new series of films, The Stigmatised; the first of these, Silence, was directed by Michał Rosa and released in 2002.

Career in politics

Piesiewicz's career in electoral politics began in 1989, when he began working in the Social Movement for Solidarity Electoral Action (RS AWS) party, originally the political wing of the Solidarity union and the leading party in the center-right AWS coalition. In 1991 he was elected to the Polish Senate, served for two years, then returned in 1997. In 2002, RS AWS changed its name to RS and elected Piesiewicz as its leader; he officiated until the dissolution of the party in 2004. From 2005 to 2009, Piesiewicz belonged to Platforma Obywatelska's club in the Senate, but did not belong to the party itself. In 2011 he did not run for reelection.

He has been described as having "lobbied hard against capital punishment, writing countless articles in the Polish press".

Personal life

He is divorced from his ex-wife Maria. He is Roman Catholic.

See also
 A Short Film About Killing
 Dekalog: Five

References

External links
 
 Official home page

1945 births
Living people
Anti–death penalty activists
Capital punishment in Poland
Lawyers from Warsaw
Polish Roman Catholics
Polish screenwriters
Polish male writers
University of Warsaw alumni
Members of the Senate of Poland 1991–1993
Members of the Senate of Poland 1997–2001
Members of the Senate of Poland 2001–2005
Members of the Senate of Poland 2005–2007
Members of the Senate of Poland 2007–2011